Lee Hyeon-sook (born December 29, 1971) is a South Korean manhwa artist who made her debut in 1992. Her works include Seduction More Beautiful Than Love, about a teacher and her student, and The Flower of Evil, a dark story about twins.

Works 
 Making Friends (1992)
 Ocean of Stars (1999)
 Really?! (2001)
 The Shadow of Moon (2001)
 Seduction More Beautiful Than Love (2004)
 Pure Love Stories (2006)
 The Flower of Evil (2006)
 Savage Garden (2009)
Nobody Knows (2012)
The Mean Boy (BL Webtoon) (CopinComics) (2014)
The Beast Must Die (BL Webtoon) (Lezhin) (2017)
I will be here for you (BL Webtoon) (Lezhin) (2022)

References

Living people
1971 births
South Korean manhwa artists
South Korean manhwa writers
South Korean female comics artists
South Korean women artists
Female comics writers